Toyne is an English surname. Notable people with this surname include:

 Fay Toyne, Australian tennis player
 Gilbert Toyne (1888–1983), Australian inventor
 Ian Toyne (1930–1999), Australian Australian rules football player
 Jeff Toyne (born 1975), Canadian film composer
 Len Toyne (1922–1998), Australian Australian rules football player
 Peter Toyne (born 1946), Australian politician
 Peter Toyne (academic)
 Phillip Toyne (1947–2015), Australian activist
 Simon Toyne (born 1968), British writer
 Stanley Toyne (1881–1962), English cricket player
 Timothy Toyne Sewell (born 1941), British army officer